The Association of Applied Biologists (AAB) is a United Kingdom biological science learned society. From its foundation in 1904 until 1934, the institution was the Association of Economic Biologists. It publishes research and holds conferences in different specialisms of applied biology.

History 
The AAB was founded in 1904 as the Association of Economic Biologists for workers in applied biology "to discuss new discoveries, to exchange experiences and carefully consider the best methods of work" and "promote and advance the science of Economic Biology in its agricultural, horticultural, medical and commercial aspects." "Within 10 years of its foundation, the association became the recognised society for all British workers interested in applied biology. Since then, the association has steadily expanded its knowledge." In 1934, the current title of Association of Applied Biologists was adopted. With some 900 members from a wide range of specialisms in the UK and overseas, "it has developed a portfolio of scientific publications and annual conference programme to achieve its objectives and promote the subject of applied biology."

The AAB organises conferences with universities specialising in agriculture and other aspects of applied biology, these have included Aberystwyth, Cambridge, Edinburgh, Newcastle, Nottingham, Reading and Illinois. It has working relationships with research institutes in agriculture, such as James Hutton Institute, the John Innes Centre and the Rothamsted Experimental Station. Papers published by the AAB are cited by governmental departments including Department for Environment, Food and Rural Affairs, Food and Environment Research Agency, Scottish Agricultural Science Agency and Biotechnology and Biological Sciences Research Council.

Aims 
The aims of the AAB are "To promote the study and advancement of all branches of Biology and in particular (but without prejudice to the generality of the foregoing), to foster the practice, growth and development of applied biology, including the application of biological sciences for the production and preservation of food, fibre and other materials and for the maintenance and improvement of earth's physical environment."

Management

Specialist groups 
The AAB caters for specialist interests in applied biology through its group structure.
Applied Mycology and Bacteriology
Biological Control and Integrated Pest Management
Cropping and the Environment
Food Systems
Nematology
Pesticide Application
Plant Physiology and Crop Improvement
Soil Biology
Virology

Each group has a convenor who organises meetings of the group members, drawn from industry, research organisations and academia, to plan future conferences and other activities. This structure ensures that the final programme will be relevant to the membership and also to the needs of industry. The annual programme is assembled by a programme secretary who presents conference plans on a regular basis for approval by Council.

President and Council 

The AAB is managed by an executive who reports to the council consisting of elected executive members and the Convenors of the Specialist Subject groups. Executive meets as required and council meets three times a year and reports to all members through the AGM. The president and vice president (president-elect) are elected at the AGM and serve a two-year term.

The current president is Mr Stuart Knight, and the president-elect is Professor Christine Foyer. Previous presidents have been:

Publications 
The association has three peer-reviewed scientific journals: Annals of Applied Biology, owned by the Association and published by Wiley-Blackwell, Plant Biotechnology Journal, which is co-owned with the Society for Experimental Biology and Wiley-Blackwell and Food and Energy Security which is also jointly owned with Wiley-Blackwell, launched in 2012 and has successfully published its first full Volume. The Journals of the Association have Editorial Offices in Wellesbourne and Bristol. In launching the new online-only, open-access journal Food and Energy Security, The Association "hopes to provide an innovative global platform to enhance the dissemination of research and developments in applied biology to a wider audience."

Alongside its conferences, the AAB has produced various publications including Aspects of Applied Biology, the database CD ROM Descriptions of Plant Viruses, and a regular newsletter with articles of topical interest, reports and announcements. In addition, the AAB produced a centenary book in 2004 to celebrate this milestone. As well as chronicalling the history of the association, the book also contains a message from the Queen's Office and a foreword by the 2004 President of the Royal Society, Lord May.

Conferences 
The AAB organises conferences to disseminate the latest developments in applied biology, providing a source of information for both the industry and its members. These are mainly held in Europe, particularly in the UK. Recent international conferences have been held in the US, the Netherlands and Ireland. Every autumn the Association holds its Annual General Meeting (AGM), in line with its requirements by the Charity Commission for England and Wales. In 2011, this was held at the Olde Barne Hotel, Lincolnshire alongside a conference on disease detection in crops. Amongst other locations, the AGM has previously been held at Kew Gardens, Wisley Gardens RHS and Campden BRI.

The AAB also holds a succession of conferences in its specialist subjects throughout the year, as outlined in the conference calendar on the official AAB website. These meetings may take the form of residential conferences, one day meetings or training workshops. Most attract BASIS points, showing their relevance to the agricultural industry. It has close links with other learned Societies and professional bodies and frequently organises conferences with or for their appropriate groups, often publishing Aspects of Applied Biology on their behalf. Conferences are widely advertised and schemes exist to support attendance by research students and researchers from overseas. Typically at one conference each year a poster competition is held for PhD students.

References

External links 
AAB website

Biology organisations based in the United Kingdom
Charities based in Warwickshire
Organisations based in Warwickshire
Stratford-on-Avon District
Science and technology in Warwickshire